Peter Elzinga (born 30 January 1981, Almere, Netherlands), is a Dutch athlete who competes in compound archery. His achievements include becoming the world number one ranked archer in 2004, European individual champion in 2004 and mixed team champion in 2012, and FITA Archery World Cup stage wins as part of the Dutch men's team in 2006 and 2009.

References

1981 births
Living people
Dutch male archers

Sportspeople from Almere

World Archery Championships medalists
21st-century Dutch people